Lynch Island is an island lying in the eastern part of Marshall Bay, close off the south coast of Coronation Island in the South Orkney Islands, Antarctica.

History
The island was roughly charted in 1912–13 by Petter Sørlle, a Norwegian whaling captain, and surveyed in 1933 by Discovery Investigations personnel. The island was resurveyed in 1948–49 by the Falkland Islands Dependencies Survey and named by the UK Antarctic Place-Names Committee for Thomas Lynch, an American sealer who visited the South Orkney Islands in the schooner Express in 1880.

Antarctic Specially Protected Area
The island has been designated an Antarctic Specially Protected Area (ASPA 110) for its biological values, especially its relatively luxuriant plant communities. The continent's only two flowering plants, Antarctic hair grass and Antarctic pearlwort, are abundant. The soils associated with the grass swards contain a rich invertebrate fauna.

See also
List of Antarctic and subantarctic islands

References

Islands of the South Orkney Islands
Antarctic Specially Protected Areas